Quoya oldfieldii, commonly known as Oldfield's foxglove, is a flowering plant in the mint family Lamiaceae and is endemic to the south-west of Western Australia. It is an erect shrub with its branches and leaves densely covered with a layer of brownish hairs. The leaves are egg-shaped and the tube-shaped flowers are pink with purple spots inside.

Description

The flowers are surrounded by bracts and bracteoles which are hairy on the outer surface and glabrous on the inside. The sepal tube and lobes are densely hairy on the outside and mostly glabrous inside. The lowest lobe is very broad, more or less circular and twice as large as the others. The outside of the petal tube is hairy, although not so hairy as the sepals, and glabrous inside apart from a ring of hairs around the ovary. The four stamens are about the same length as the tube, one pair shorter than the other. Flowering occurs mainly from June to November or December and is followed by fruit which is hairy, oval or almost spherical and has the sepals attached.

Taxonomy and naming
This species was first formally described in 1859 by Ferdinand von Mueller who gave it the name Chloanthes oldfieldii. The description was published in Fragmenta phytographiae Australiae from a specimen collected by Augustus Oldfield near the Murchison River. In 2011, Barry Conn and Murray Henwood changed the name to Quoya oldfieldii and published the change in Australian Systematic Botany. The specific epithet (oldfieldii) honours the collector of the type specimen.

Distribution and habitat
Oldfield's foxglove grows in sand and gravelly soil on sandplains mainly between Geraldton and Shark Bay in the Geraldton Sandplains and Yalgoo biogeographic regions.

Conservation
Quoya oldfieldii is classified as "not threatened" by the Western Australian Government Department of Parks and Wildlife.

References

oldfieldii
Plants described in 1859
Taxa named by Ferdinand von Mueller